John D'Silva, or variant spellings, may refer to:

John D'Silva, Indian Konkani actor
John da Silva (1934–2021), New Zealand wrestler and boxer
John de Silva (1857–1922), Sri Lankan playwright
John DeSilva (born 1967), American baseball player 
Johnathan Aparecido da Silva (born 1990), Brazilian footballer
Jon DaSilva (born 1963), British DJ and producer
Bertie de Silva (John Albert de Silva, 1901–1981), Ceylonesse cricketer

See also
John Silva (disambiguation)
John da Silva Antao (born 1933), priest
John D. Silva (1920–2012), American engineer